The 'Mixed Team event at the 2010 South American Games was held over March 19–20. The seven teams were split into 2 groups, with the best two advancing to the semifinals. The contests

Medalists

Results

Group stage

Group A

Group B

Semifinals

Final

5th place

3rd Place

Final

References
Bronze-medal match
Final

Mixed Team
Southamerican